Somatic theory is a theory of human social behavior based loosely on the somatic marker hypothesis of António Damásio, which proposes a mechanism by which emotional processes can guide (or bias) behavior, particularly decision-making, as well as the attachment theory of John Bowlby and the self psychology of Heinz Kohut, especially as consolidated by Allan Schore.

It draws on various philosophical models from On the Genealogy of Morals of Friedrich Nietzsche through Martin Heidegger on das Man, Maurice Merleau-Ponty on the lived body, and Ludwig Wittgenstein on social practices to Michel Foucault on discipline, as well as theories of performativity emerging out of the speech act theory of J. L. Austin, especially as developed by Judith Butler and Shoshana Felman; some somatic theorists have also tied somaticity to performance in the schools of actor training developed by Konstantin Stanislavski and Bertolt Brecht.

Theorists

Barbara Sellers-Young 

Barbara Sellers-Young applies Damasio’s somatic-marker hypothesis to critical thinking as an embodied performance and provides a review of the theoretical literature in performance studies that supports something like Damasio’s approach:

 Howard Gardner’s theory of multiple intelligences, especially bodily-kinesthetic intelligence
Thomas Hanna’s insistence that “We cannot sense without acting and we cannot act without sensing”
 Bonnie Bainbridge Cohen's movement-pedagogy
 Konstantin Stanislavski’s acting theory that “In every physical action, unless it is purely mechanical, there is concealed some inner action, some feelings. This is how the two levels of life in a part are created, the inner and the outer. They are intertwined. A common purpose brings them together and reinforces the unbreakable bond.”

Edward Slingerland 

Edward Slingerland applies Damasio's somatic-marker hypothesis to the cognitive linguistics of Gilles Fauconnier and Mark Turner and George Lakoff and Mark Johnson, especially Fauconnier and Turner's theory of conceptual blending and Lakoff and Johnson's embodied mind theory of metaphor. His goal in importing somatic theory into cognitive linguistics is to show that

the primary purpose of achieving human scale is not to help us apprehend a situation, but rather to help us to know how to feel about it. Especially in political and religious discourse--situations where speakers are attempting to influence their listeners' values and decision-making processes--I would like to argue that the achievement of human scale is intended primarily to import normativity to the blend, which is accomplished through the recruitment of human-scale emotional-somatic reactions. This argument is essentially an attempt to connect of conceptual blending theorists with those of neuroscientists who argue for the importance of somatic states and emotional reactions in human value-creation and decision-making.

Douglas Robinson 

Douglas Robinson first began developing a somatic theory of language for a keynote presentation at the 9th American Imagery Conference in Los Angeles, on October, 1985.  It was based on Ahkter Ahsen's theory of somatic response to images as the basis for therapeutic transformations; in contradistinction to Ahsen's model, which rejected Freud's "talking cure" on the grounds that words do not awaken somatic responses, Robinson argued that there is a very powerful somatics of language. He later incorporated this notion into The Translator's Turn (1991), drawing on the (passing) somatic theories of William James, Ludwig Wittgenstein, and Kenneth Burke in order to argue that somatic response may be "idiosomatic" (somatically idiosyncratic) but typically is "ideosomatic" (somatically ideological, or shaped and guided by society), and that the ideosomatics of language explains how language remains stable enough for communication to be possible. This work preceded the Damasio group's first scientific publication on the somatic-marker hypothesis in 1991, and Robinson did not begin to incorporate Damasio's somatic-marker hypothesis into his somatic theory until later in the 1990s.

In Translation and Taboo (1996) Robinson drew on the protosomatic theories of Sigmund Freud, Jacques Lacan, and Gregory Bateson to explore the ways in which the ideosomatics of taboo structure (and partly sanction and conceal) the translation of sacred texts. His first book to draw on Damasio's somatic-marker hypothesis is Performative Linguistics (2003); there he draws on J. L. Austin's theory of speech acts, Jacques Derrida's theory of iterability, and Mikhail Bakhtin's theory of dialogism to argue that performativity as an activity of the speaking body is grounded in somaticity. He also draws on Daniel Simeoni's application of Pierre Bourdieu's theory of habitus in order to argue that his somatics of translation as developed in The Translator's Turn actually explains translation norms more fully than Gideon Toury in Descriptive Translation Studies and beyond (1995).

In 2005, Robinson began writing a series of books exploring somatic theory in different communicative contexts: modernist/formalist theories of estrangement (Robinson 2008), translation as ideological pressure (Robinson 2011), first-year writing (Robinson 2012), and the refugee experience, (de)colonization, and the intergenerational transmission of trauma (Robinson 2013).

In Robinson's articulation, somatic theory has four main planks:

 the stabilization of social constructions through somatic markers
 the interpersonal sharing of such stabilizations through the mimetic somatic transfer
 the regulatory (ideosomatic) circulation or reticulation of such somatomimeses through an entire group in the somatic exchange
 the "klugey" nature of social regulation through the somatic exchange, leading to various idiosomatic failures and refusals to be fully regulated

In addition, he has added concepts along the way: the proprioception of the body politic as a homeostatic balancing between too much familiarity and too much strangeness (Robinson 2008); tensions between loconormativity and xenonormativity, the exosomatization of places, objects, and skin color, and paleosomaticity (Robinson 2013); ecosis and icosis (unpublished work).

Stephanie Fetta 

Stephanie Fetta’s approach to somatic theory weaves together an extensive array of disciplinary discourses, ranging from cognitive science and neuroscience to sociology and Sophiology. As a literary and cultural critic, Fetta draws attention to and investigates the role of the soma in her study of US Latin@/x creative texts. Her scholarly work broadens the scope of somatic theory and literary scholarship by drawing support from the natural and social sciences to position the soma as a “psychobiological agent” and social actor, and thus an overlooked (albeit indispensable) lens in the study of social power (2018, 37). Building on both biblical and contemporary uses of the term, Fetta reconceptualizes the soma as ‘the emotional, intelligent and communicative body’ and explains that it refers to the gestures of the physical body in internal response to external social pressures. Hence, she is one of the first somatic theorists to employ the term soma along these lines—despite the current spate of studies in neurology, cognitive literary studies, behavioral science, body studies, affect theory, theories of mind (ToM) and philosophy of mind (PoM) which piece together the connections among cognitive processes, bodily feeling reactions, and evaluative perceptions.

In 2018, she published Shaming into Brown: Somatic Transactions of Race in Latina/o Literature, a detailed and analytic transdisciplinary study which renders the soma as “a pervasive yet unexpected site of subjectivity,” one she employs as a primary tool to investigate intersectional racialization and the transactions of race in her case studies of Latin@/x literature (xiii). This book develops somatic analysis as a line of investigation, which reviewers hold has applications in fields as diverse as the humanities, critical race theory, neurology, behavioral studies, and so on. Somatic analysis has inspired and been cited in a growing number of academic, personal, and artistic works.

Fetta’s key applications of somatic analysis are as follows:
 Racial Shaming: a social technology that uses the somatic body to materialize Brown into social fact. Her thesis is anchored in two psychoanalytic theories, bioenergetic analysis developed by Alexander Lowen and affect theory put forth by Silvan Tomkins. 
 Scenes of Racialization: a stepped social practice in which “bodies impose social asymmetries through somatic expression” (2018, xv). Fetta identifies four steps, or somatic sequences, through which the notion of race conditions personal and intersubjective interactions. The racializer begins by (1) identifying phenotypic and somatic cues as a reason to stymie somatic mirroring and withdraw interpersonal rapport with the racialized interlocutor, blocking any sort of empathy toward her or him. This leads in turn to (2) social rejection and somatic dissonance, which functions as a source of shame. In line with Damasio’s somatic marker hypothesis, she argues (3) socially and culturally crafted sensory scripts are applied, (4) completing the process of racialization with a somatic expression of disgust, as registered through the senses (vision, audition and olfaction). 
 Internal Soma: Fetta examines racialization from the perspective of the somatic interior body. In her case study of Oscar ‘Zeta’ Acosta’s Autobiography of a Brown Buffalo (1972), she takes heed of the parallels between Oscar’s struggle with internalized self-loathing and his nonconforming somatic stomach.
 Somatic Portrayal: a process relied on by successful Method actors, in which actors must override their own somatic expression by inhabiting and portraying the soma of their character. Fetta further complicates the performance goal of Method acting’s purportedly real somatic portrayal and contends that such portrayal may “rub up against another style of acting [she] refers to as body image management […] which lacks the naturalness of lived somatic expression” (2018, 95).  Extended to the concept of magico nanny, somatic performance is exacted of social inferiors, whose true somatic expression could betray vulnerability to shaming or even violence
 The Soma and Sophia: Fetta also (re)introduces Sophia, the second figure in certain Christian trinities, to literary analysis and somatic theory. She explains that Andres Montoya’s poetry collection, The Ice Worker Sings and Other Poems (1999), provides another vision of the soma—a spiritual or divine soma, one that transforms pain, suffering, and sin through the sacred figure of Sophia. Thereby, she claims that Sophia is not only a biblical figure, but also a powerful analytic of the divine soma.

References

Further reading 

 Damasio, Antonio R. (1994). Descartes’ Error: Emotion, Reason, and the Human Brain. New York: Putnam.
 Damasio, Antonio R. (1999). The Feeling of What Happens: Body and Emotion in the Making of Consciousness. New York: Harcourt.
 Damasio, Antonio R. (2003). Looking for Spinoza: Joy, Sorrow, and the Feeling Brain. New York: Harcourt.
 Felman, Shoshana. (1980/2003). The Scandal of the Speaking Body: Don Juan With J. L. Austin, or Seduction in Two Languages. Translated by Catherine Porter. Stanford: Stanford University Press.
 Fetta, Stephanie. (2016). "A Bad Attitude and A Bad Stomach: The Soma in Oscar 'Zeta' Acosta’s The Autobiography of a Brown Buffalo." Transmodernity: Journal of Peripheral Cultural Production of the Luso-Hispanic World, 6.1: 89-109.
 Fetta, Stephanie. (2018). Shaming into Brown: Somatic Transactions of Race in Latina/o Literature. Columbus: Ohio State University Press.
 Hanna, Thomas. (1995). "What is Somatics?" In Don Hanlon Johnson, ed., Bone, Breath and Gesture, 341-53. Berkeley: North Atlantic.
 Robinson, Douglas. (1991). The Translator’s Turn. Baltimore and London: Johns Hopkins University Press.
 Robinson, Douglas. (1996). Translation and Taboo. DeKalb: Northern Illinois University Press.
 Robinson, Douglas. (2003). Performative Linguistics: Speaking and Translating as Doing Things With Words. London and New York: Routledge.
 Robinson, Douglas. (2008). Estrangement and the Somatics of Literature: Tolstoy, Shklovsky, Brecht. Baltimore: Johns Hopkins University Press.
 Robinson, Douglas. (2011). Translation and the Problem of Sway. Amsterdam and Philadelphia: John Benjamins.
 Robinson, Douglas. (2012). First-Year Writing and the Somatic Exchange. New York: Hampton.
 Robinson, Douglas. (2013). Displacement and the Somatics of Postcolonial Culture. Columbus: Ohio State University Press, forthcoming.
 Sellers-Young, Barbara. (2002). "Breath, Perception, and Action: The Body and Critical Thinking." Consciousness, Literature and the Arts 3.2 (August).
 Sellers-Young, Barbara (1998) "Somatic Processes: Convergence of Theory and Practice," Theatre Topics 8/2 (September 1998) 173-187.
 Sellers-Young, Barbara (1999) "Technique and the Embodied Actor," Theatre Research International 24/1 (Spring 199) 89-102.
 Sellers-Young, Barbara (2008) “Consciousness, Contemplation and the Academy,” Consciousness, Literature and the Arts, 9/1 (April) 1-15.
 Sellers-Young, Barbara (2013) “Stillness in Motion – Motion in Stillness: Contemplative Practice and the Performing Arts”, Embodied Consciousness – Performance Technologies, New York: Palgrave.
 Slingerland, Edward G. (2005). "Conceptual Blending, Somatic Marking, and Normativity: A Case Example from Ancient China." Cognitive Linguistics 16.3: 557-584.
 Slingerland, Edward G., Eric Blanchard and Lyn Boyd-Judson. (2007). "Collision with China: Conceptual Metaphor Analysis, Somatic Marking, and the EP3 Incident." International Studies Quarterly 51: 53-77.
 Stanislavski, Konstantin. (1961/1989). Creating a Role. Translated by Elizabeth Reynolds Hapgood. London and New York: Routledge.

Neuropsychology
Behavior
Emotion
Sociological theories
Humanities
Social theories
Somatic psychology